Cythnia is a genus of sea snails, marine gastropod mollusks in the family Rissoellidae.

Species
There are only two known species to exist within this genus, these include the following:

 Cythnia albida (Carpenter, 1864)
 Cythnia asteriaphila (Carpenter, 1864)

References

Rissoellidae